Monoon shendurunii is a species of plant in the Annonaceae family. It is endemic to Kerala in India. It was reclassified from the genus Polyathia to Monoon.

References

shendurunii
Flora of Kerala
Endangered plants
Taxonomy articles created by Polbot